Lake Shenorock is a lake located in the hamlet of Shenorock in the town of Somers, New York.  The lake is used for fishing and was used for recreational swimming until the Clean Water Act was passed and the lake became a source of drinking water.  The Clean Water Act was passed in 1972, recreational swimming ended in 1977.   The lake is part of the Croton Reservoir System and is a tributary to the Amawalk Reservoir, which is used as a source of water for New York City residents.  There are no major tributaries to the class B lake.

The lake is named after Shawanórõckquot, a Wiechquaeskeck sachem.

Geography

Lake Shenorock is located at  (41.331850, -73.739323).
Lake Shenorock is located north of the Amawalk Reservoir.

 Basin: Lower Hudson River
 Size: 
 Lake Origins: Augmented by Dam
 Watershed Area: 
 Mean Depth: 
 Sounding Depth:

Lake uses 
Lake Shenorock is classified as a class B lake, its intended use is for swimming.  A beach, cement dock and dam can be found on the shore of the lake. Swimming is now banned and Lake Shenorock is used for recreation fishing.  The recreational uses are considered to be impaired due to algae and poor water transparency.  High levels of phosphorus greatly contribute to the algal growth, low levels of oxygen, and poor water transparency.

Wildlife 
The state of New York does not stock the lake with fish.  Lake Shenorock is a warmwater fishery environment that is home to largemouth bass, crappie, sunfish, catfish, and other wildlife such as duck, swan, chelydridae, canada goose, and even muskrat.  These are just some of species that inhabit the lake ecosystem, there has been no scientific documentation of the species that live in the lake ecosystem.

Recreational usage 
Lake Shenorock once supported two beaches but they were closed in 1977 so that it could be used as a backup supply for the Amawalk and Shenorock water district and tributary to the Amawalk Reservoir.  The current association, the United Owners Association of Shenorock, submitted a proposal to the Somers Town Board to create a Park District where recreational swimming would be able to return to the lake after renditions to the Lake were made.  Due to the Eutrophic condition of the lake and lack of a clubhouse, restoration projects such as dredging and installment of aeration devices would need to be implemented to enable recreational swimming.

Health 

The lake is currently undergoing a eutrophic process at a faster rate due to the run off of fertilizers that contain chemicals such as phosphorus. This is causing the lake to undergo the natural process of transitioning into a swamp at a faster rate.

Water flow 

Lake Shenorock has no named tributaries but water released from Lake Shenorock flows into the Amawalk Reservoir. Water which is either released out of Amawalk Reservoir flows south in the Muscoot River and eventually enters the Muscoot Reservoir, and then flows into the New Croton Reservoir. The water enters the New Croton Aqueduct, which sends water to the Jerome Park Reservoir in the Bronx, where the water is distributed to the Bronx and to northern Manhattan. On average, the New Croton Aqueduct delivers 10% of New York City's drinking water. The water that doesn't enter the New Croton Aqueduct will flow into the Hudson River at Croton Point.

References

Shenorock
Shenorock
Somers, New York